The Bodyguard 2 is a 2007 Thai action-comedy film written, directed by and starring Petchtai Wongkamlao. A prequel to his 2004 film, The Bodyguard, The Bodyguard 2 tells the origins of Petchtai's bodyguard character, and like the first film, it features a host of cameo appearances by Thai celebrities, including action star Tony Jaa.

With a budget of over 100,000,000 baht, the film was the most expensive in Thai cinema before Ong Bak 2 surpassed it in late 2008.

Plot

Khamlao is a Black op Counter-terrorismsecret agent for the country of Wongnaileum, which shares the common Isan dialect and culture with its neighboring country, Thailand (similar to [Laos]). He is dispatched to Bangkok on a secret mission to track down some terrorists. To do so, he goes undercover as a luk thung singer working for a record label that serves as a front company for dealers in weapons of mass destruction. As he probes deep inside the record company, he finds that the company's executive secretary is actually a CIA agent, assigned to the same mission. Meanwhile, Khamlao's wife, Keaw, discovers that Khamlao had lied to her about his job in Thailand.

The film ends where the first film starts.

Cast
Petchtai Wongkamlao as Khamlao / Khum Lhau
Janet Keaw as Keaw
Jacqueline Apitananon as Paula
Sushin Kuan-saghaun as Sushin
Surachai Sombatchareon as Surachai
Pongsak Pongsuwan as Guru
Tony Jaa as Elephant vendor

External links
 
 

2007 films
Thai action comedy films
Sahamongkol Film International films
Thai-language films
Isan
Films about bodyguards
Films set in a fictional country
2007 action comedy films
2007 comedy films